John Ellis (born 2 May 1952) is an Irish former Fianna Fáil politician, who was a Teachta Dála (TD) and Senator between 1977 and 2011.

Born in Fenagh, County Leitrim, Ellis was a farmer and businessman before entering politics. He is married with three children.

He was elected as a member of Leitrim County Council in 1974, and served as the council chairman from 1986 to 1987 and from 1992 to 1993.

He first entered the Oireachtas in 1977, when he was elected to the 14th Seanad by the Agricultural Panel. He was first elected to Dáil Éireann at the 1981 general election for the Sligo–Leitrim constituency, and held the seat at the February 1982 general election. In a most unusual occurrence, Ellis lost his seat at the November 1982 general election despite topping the poll on the first count.

In 1983 he was elected to the 17th Seanad, again by the Agricultural Panel. He stood again in Sligo–Leitrim at the 1987 general election, and was returned to the 25th Dáil. He was re-elected at the 1989, 1992, 1997 and 2002 general elections. Boundary changes then placed him in the newly created Roscommon–South Leitrim constituency; he stood for election there at the 2007 general election, but failed to win a seat. He was nominated by the Taoiseach, Bertie Ahern, to the Seanad on 3 August 2007.

Ellis was involved in a controversy owing to the Stanlow Trading scandal of the late 1980s, where 80 families were left unpaid by the company, set up by him and his two brothers, Caillian and Richard.

References

 

1952 births
Living people
Fianna Fáil TDs
Irish farmers
Local councillors in County Leitrim
Members of the 14th Seanad
Members of the 22nd Dáil
Members of the 23rd Dáil
Members of the 17th Seanad
Members of the 25th Dáil
Members of the 26th Dáil
Members of the 27th Dáil
Members of the 28th Dáil
Members of the 29th Dáil
Members of the 23rd Seanad
Nominated members of Seanad Éireann
Fianna Fáil senators